GData (Google Data Protocol) provides a simple protocol for reading and writing data on the Internet, designed by Google. GData combines common XML-based syndication formats (Atom and RSS) with a feed-publishing system based on the Atom Publishing Protocol, plus some extensions for handling queries. It relies on XML or JSON as a data format.

Google provides GData client libraries for Java, JavaScript, .NET, PHP, Python, and Objective-C.

Implementations 
An implementation called libgdata written in C is available under the LGPL license.

See also
 Open Data Protocol (OData) – competing protocol from Microsoft
 Resource Description Framework (RDF) – a similar concept by W3C

References

External links
 GData
 Learning from THE WEB by Adam Bosworth - the vision behind GData

Atom (Web standard)
Google
Web syndication formats